Yoldia Sea is a name given by geologists to a variable brackish water stage in the Baltic Sea basin that prevailed after the Baltic Ice Lake was drained to sea level during the Weichselian glaciation. Dates for the Yoldia sea are obtained mainly by radiocarbon dating material from ancient sediments and shore lines and from clay-varve chronology.
They tend to vary by as much as a thousand years, but a good estimate is 10,300 – 9500 radiocarbon years BC, equivalent to ca 11,700–10,700 calendar years BC. The sea ended gradually when isostatic rise of Scandinavia closed or nearly closed its effluents, altering the balance between saline and fresh water. The Yoldia Sea became Ancylus Lake. The Yoldia Sea stage had three phases of which only the middle phase had brackish water.

The name of the sea is adapted from the obsolete name of the bivalve, Portlandia arctica (previously known as Yoldia arctica), found around Stockholm. This bivalve requires cold saline water. 
It characterizes the middle phase of the Yoldia Sea, during which saline water poured into the Baltic, before the acceleration of glacial melting.

Description

The Baltic Ice Lake, the Yoldia Sea, the Ancylus Lake and the Littorina Sea are four recognized stages in the postglacial progression of the Baltic basin – there are also transition periods which can be considered as substages. From earliest to most recent they run: 
  The Baltic Ice Lake – fresh water proglacial lake with level greater than sea level – dammed by glacial ice until the ice dam broke free at the north slope of Billingen uplands – the lake level then dropped ~ 26 meters to sea level - ~ 10,000 years before the present (B.C.).
 Transition period - Between the Baltic Ice Lake and the Yoldia Sea there was a transient lake stage before the ingression of salt water. This lasted ~300 years (292 - 309 annual deposition varves are seen in the geologic record, depending on where measured).
 The Yoldia Sea – a short lived connection with the sea across south-central Sweden over the Närke strait – approximately 10,000 to 9,600 B.C..
 The Ancylus Lake – creation of a fresh water lake through uplift, which blocked the Närke strait- 9,600 to 7,800 ΒP.
 The Littorina Sea – with the rise in sea level and the submergence of the Øresund strait, the Baltic again communicated with the North Sea beginning ~ 7,800 ΒP to present.  This is sometimes split into substages:
 The Mastogloia Sea -  a substage sometimes used to distinguish the period between 8000 and 7000 years ago when the Baltic became distinctly brackish - during this period the English Channel and the Danish straits circulation was established, increasing Atlantic water inflow.
 The Limnea Sea – a substage sometimes used to distinguish the transition of the Baltic Sea to a more stagnant phase, which currently exists – about 2,500 B.C.

The Baltic Ice Lake came to an end when it overflowed through central Sweden and drained, a process complete by about 10,300 B.C. (radiocarbon years). The straits through the present Stockholm region (via Lake Vänern and the Strait of Närke) to the Atlantic were the only outlet at that time. When lake level reached sea level the difference in salinity caused a backflow from the North Sea, creating saline regions in which the marine bivalve Yoldia flourished. This phase lasted until about 10,000 B.C..

Subsequently, increased melting of the glacier provided additional fresh water and the lake became stratified (meromictic), with salt water on the bottom and fresh on top. Over the life of the sea and from location to location the salinity was a variable. Whether it is possible to speak of stages of salinity that would apply uniformly to the whole sea is debatable.

At about 10,000 B.C., the exit continued to rise and the lake/sea broke through Denmark creating the first Great Belt channels. The total opening was less than 1 km wide and included two channels at the northern end. The Great Belt channels was blocked again by rising land from the post-glacial rebound that created Ancylus Lake.

Geographically, the Gulf of Bothnia remained under the ice. The Gulf of Finland was open but most of Finland was an archipelago, over which debris carried by glacial streams gradually spread. A land bridge joined Germany to southern Sweden through Denmark. Relieved of its weight of ice, Finland rose gradually and unevenly from the sea. Parts of the Yoldia shoreline are above sea level today while other parts remain below. The Yoldia Sea toward its end was about 30m below current sea level. A channel at the location of the Neva River connected Yoldia Sea to Lake Ladoga.

The Yoldia Sea existed entirely within the Boreal Blytt–Sernander period. The forests and species lining its shores were boreal. Mesolithic cultures continued to occupy Denmark/south Sweden and the southern shores of the sea. The sea as an ecologic system came to an end when Scandinavia rose sufficiently to block the flow through the Stockholm area and the saline balance shifted toward a lacustrine ecology once again.

References

History of the Baltic Sea
Glaciology